Pembroke High School, is a public secondary school located on 80 Learning Lane in Pembroke, Massachusetts, United States.

The school serves students in grades 9-12 and has an approximate student population of 930 students.

It is the only high school serving the town of Pembroke. Students come directly from Pembroke Community Middle School (PCMS). The three elementary schools in the town include Hobomock Elementary, Bryantville Elementary, and North Pembroke Elementary School.

History

Pembroke High School was formed in 2004 when the town of Pembroke split away from the Silver Lake Regional School District over concerns about overcrowding, and that Pembroke consisted of half of the population of the then four town district.  The building was constructed as the Pembroke campus of the Silver Lake Regional High School and opened in October 1976, and was subsequently the Silver Lake District's middle school.

Pembroke's middle school is located on Rte. 27, and was the Silver Lake Junior High School from 1968 to 1991, when the district's middle school shifted to the Learning Lane building.  Upon Pembroke's secession from the Silver Lake district in 2004, the town repurchased the property, establishing it as the new Pembroke Community Middle School.

Clubs and activities

Pembroke High School has a wide range of clubs for students. Popular clubs include Key Club, DECA, and Drama. The complete list of clubs are as follows:

Art Club
Audio Engineering Club
Best Buddies
Celtic Music Club
DECA
Environmental Club
Fall Festival of Plays
Gay/Straight Alliance
Jazz Band
Key Club
Literary Magazine
Marching Band
Math Club
Men's Choir
Mock Trial
National Honor Society
Newspaper
Outdoor Club
Photography Club
Robotics Club
Shakespeare Club
Spring Plays
Student Council
Titans Against Destructive Decisions
Thespian Society - Thespian Troupe 7127
Ultimate Frisbee
Water Polo
Women's Choir
Yearbook

Demographics

As of 2008, the population of the school was 98% white, with 10% of the student body of low income and 10% classified as special needs.  95% of targeted students met MCAS requirements for English, while 88% met MCAS requirements for mathematics.

Athletics

The school's sports teams are known as the Titans, and the school colors are Blue, Red & White. Pembroke competes in the Patriot League. The Patriot League's members are Scituate, Quincy, Hanover, Middleborough, Duxbury, Hingham, Plymouth North, Plymouth South, Whitman-Hanson, North Quincy, and Silver Lake. The league is divided into two divisions, Patriot-Fisher and Patriot-Keenan. These divisions are divided up based on school population, with Pembroke being a member of the Patriot-Fisher division.

References

External links
 Pembroke High School Website
 2006 Adequate Yearly Progress (AYP) Data
 2008 NCLB report card

Educational institutions established in 2004
Pembroke, Massachusetts
Schools in Plymouth County, Massachusetts
Public high schools in Massachusetts
2004 establishments in Massachusetts